Tarvastu is a village in Viljandi Parish, Viljandi County, Estonia. It's located about a kilometer east of Mustla. Tarvastu has a population of 99 (as of 2006). The village is passed by the Tarvastu River and the Viljandi–Rõngu road (nr 52). Estonian second largest lake Võrtsjärv also shares a small border with the village's territory.

Tarvastu is the birthplace of Estonian wrestler Martin Klein (1884-1947) who won a silver medal  at the 1912 Summer Olympics.

Gallery

References

Villages in Viljandi County
Kreis Fellin